Holger Rune was the defending champion, but he chose not to participate.

Dominic Stricker won the title, defeating Leandro Riedi in an all-Swiss final, 6–2, 6–4.

Seeds

Draw

Finals

Top half

Section 1

Section 2

Bottom half

Section 3

Section 4

References

External links 
Draw at rolandgarros.com
Draw at ITFtennis.com

Boys' Singles
2020